SS Francis Asbury was a Liberty ship built in the United States during World War II. She was named after Francis Asbury, one of the first two bishops of the Methodist Episcopal Church in the United States. Ashbury traveled thousands of miles those living on the frontier to deliver hundreds of sermons each year.

Construction
Francis Asbury was laid down on 12 September 1942, under a Maritime Commission (MARCOM) contract, MC hull 1195, by the St. Johns River Shipbuilding Company, Jacksonville, Florida; she was sponsored by Mrs. Benjamin F. Crowles, the wife of one of the vice presidents  of the St. John's River SB Co., she was launched on 17 April 1943.

History
She was allocated to A.H. Bull & Co., Inc., on 5 June. On 3 December 1944, she was mined off Ostend, Belgium, while steaming from New York to Ostend, with war supplies. She was beached off Blankenberge, and declared a Constructive Total Loss (CTL). She was sold for scrapping, on 6 April 1953, to Hydraulica, for $2000. She was delivered, 28 April 1953.

Wreck location:

References

Bibliography

 
 
 
 

 

Liberty ships
Ships built in Jacksonville, Florida
1943 ships
Ships sunk by mines
Maritime incidents in December 1944